Trismegistomya is a genus of parasitic flies in the family Tachinidae.

Species
Trismegistomya jimoharai Fleming & Wood, 2019
Trismegistomya pumilis (Reinhard, 1967)

References

Diptera of North America
Dexiinae
Tachinidae genera